André Dumont (4 May 1903 – 16 August 1994) was a French racing cyclist. He rode in the 1928 Tour de France.

References

1903 births
1994 deaths
French male cyclists
Place of birth missing